Ultracoelostoma assimile, commonly known as sooty beech scale, is a scale insect in the Margarodidae family.  It is endemic to New Zealand. It was first described by William Miles Maskell in 1890.

References

External links 

 Citizen science observations

Margarodidae
Endemic fauna of New Zealand
Insects described in 1890
Hemiptera of New Zealand
Endemic insects of New Zealand